Carl Frederik Madsen (17 November 1862 – 27 May 1944) was a Danish trade unionist and politician.

Madsen worked as a cobbler, and became chair of the shoe workers' union.  In 1908, he became the secretary of the Danish Confederation of Trade Unions, serving until 1928.  In 1920, he was appointed as a Social Democrats member of the Landstinget, serving until 1936.

In 1927, Madsen was elected as a vice-president of the International Federation of Trade Unions, but resigned the following year.

References

1862 births
1944 deaths
Danish trade union leaders
Members of the Landsting (Denmark)
Social Democrats (Denmark) politicians